The 2009 Algerian Cup Final was the 45th final of the Algerian Cup. The final took place on May 21, 2009, at Stade Mustapha Tchaker in Blida with kick-off at 16:00. CR Belouizdad beat CA Bordj Bou Arreridj 2–1 on penalties to win their six Algerian Cup. The competition winners are awarded a berth in the 2010 CAF Confederation Cup.

Pre-match

Details

References

Cup
Algeria
Algerian Cup Finals